Nukjub (also Romanized as Nūkjūb; also known as Nokjū, Nook Joo, Nowk Janūb, and Nūkchū) is a village in Bampur-e Sharqi Rural District, in the Central District of Bampur County, Sistan and Baluchestan Province, Iran. At the 2006 census, its population was 2,043, in 434 families.

References 

Populated places in Bampur County